Hotcakes is the fourth studio album by American singer-songwriter Carly Simon, released by Elektra Records, on January 11, 1974. Featuring the major hits "Haven't Got Time for the Pain" and "Mockingbird", the latter a duet with her then-husband James Taylor, Hotcakes became one of Simon's biggest selling albums. Her first concept album, the autobiographical songs portray Simon happily married and beginning a family.

The album's cover photo, taken by Ed Caraeff in late 1973, shows Simon sitting in a maternity dress, pregnant with her first child, Sally.  Produced by Richard Perry who had previously helmed No Secrets, the album features Simon on piano, including the final track "Haven't Got Time for the Pain". Simon's pregnancy prevented her from singing the highest notes of that song, so these notes were covered by a backing singer for the album, then re-recorded by Simon in early 1974 for the single release. The string-and-percussion outro at the end of the album was composed by cellist Paul Buckmaster and drummer Ralph MacDonald.

Commercial performance 
Shortly after its release, Hotcakes was certified Gold by the RIAA, for sales "of one million dollars at manufacturer's level"  in the United States. Elektra chose to release two other very prominent albums at the same time: Bob Dylan's Planet Waves and Joni Mitchell's Court and Spark. This decision very likely hurt sales of Hotcakes, and Simon was consequently angry with her label. Planet Waves hit No. 1 on the Billboard 200, Court and Spark hit No. 2, and Hotcakes peaked at No. 3. However, Hotcakes remained on the chart much longer than Planet Waves, and sold many more copies.

Reception 

Jon Landau, writing in Rolling Stone, stated Simon's ..."Hotcakes is playful-sounding with some serious overtones — a balance that best suits her for the time being." He also stated that "'Think I'm Gonna Have a Baby,' 'Forever My Love' and especially 'Haven't Got Time for the Pain' are substantial songs and performances, superior to almost everything else she has so far recorded."

Robert Christgau, writing in Creem, said, "You're So Vain" left a nice afterglow--as Ellen Willis says, it proves that rock and roll is so democratic that even a rich person can make a great single. But except for the startling "Mockingbird" (buy the forty-five if you must) the album's most interesting moment occurs when Simon whistles.

William Ruhlmann's more recent review for AllMusic rated the album 4 out of 5 stars. Ruhlmann wrote, "Misfit", in which a wife implores her carousing husband to come home, and "Think I'm Gonna Have A Baby," which celebrated the joys of same, Hotcakes was "an autobiographical concept album that defined domestic bliss at a time when Simon's listeners also were catching their breath and turning inward."

Track listing
Credits adapted from the album's liner notes.

Notes
 signifies a writer by additional lyrics

Personnel 
Credits adapted from the album's liner notes

Musicians

Production

Charts
Album – Billboard (United States)

Album – International

Singles – Billboard (United States)

References

External links
Carly Simon's Official Website

1974 albums
Carly Simon albums
Elektra Records albums
Albums produced by Richard Perry
Albums arranged by Paul Buckmaster
Concept albums